The Turkey women's national beach handball team is the national team of Turkey. It is governed by the Turkish Handball Federation and takes part in international beach handball competitions.

Results

World Championships

World Games

European Championship

See also
 Turkey national beach handball team
 Turkish women in sports

References

External links
Official website
IHF profile

Beach handball
Women's national beach handball teams
National beach women's
Women's handball in Turkey